Two New is an album by jazz pianist Mal Waldron and baritone saxophonist George Haslam recorded in 1995 and released on the English Slam label.

Reception
The Allmusic review by Steve Loewy stated "there is a remarkable telepathy between the players, which translates to some delightful interaction between these two masters".

Track listing
All compositions by Mal Waldron and George Haslam except as indicated
  "I've Got the World on a String" (Harold Arlen, Ted Koehler) – 6:25 
 "One for Steve" – 6:03 
 "Tangled Lawful Bells" – 5:14 
 "Let's Do It Over" (George Haslam) – 6:08 
 "Sakura Sakura (Cherry Blossom)" (Traditional) – 4:12 
 "Steps in Rhythm" (Haslam) – 5:09 
 "Datura" (Richard Leigh Harris) – 4:45 
 "From Charleston Till Now" – 9:39 
 "Come Sunday" (Duke Ellington) – 6:28 
 "I'm Old Fashioned" (Jerome Kern, Johnny Mercer) – 5:27 
 "After the Carnage" (Mal Waldron) – 4:42 
 "Thailand Dance" – 9:10 
Recorded in Oxfordshire, England on April 20, 1995

Personnel
Mal Waldron – piano
George Haslam – baritone saxophone, tarogato

References

1995 albums
Mal Waldron albums
George Haslam albums